Judith Roberts may refer to:

Judith Roberts (Australian actress) (born 1944), Australian actress, wife of actor Reg Gorman
Judith Roberts (1958–1972), English murder victim in the Andrew Evans case
Judith Roberts (producer) (born 1970), American film producer and writer whose credits include Simply Irresistible
Judith Roberts (actress), (born 1934), American actress
Judith Roberts (swimmer) (1934–2016), American former competition swimmer

See also
Roberts (surname)